Ubiquitin-associated protein 2-like is a protein that in humans is encoded by the UBAP2L gene.

Interactions
UBAP2L has been shown to interact with BAT2.

References

Further reading